Citrus Park is an unincorporated area and census-designated place (CDP) in Maricopa County, Arizona, United States. The population was 5,194 at the time of the 2020 census, an increase of 28.9% over the population of 4,028 in 2010.

Geography
Citrus Park is on the western side of the Phoenix metropolitan area. It is bordered to the south by Goodyear and to the east by Glendale. Perryville Road, which forms the western boundary of Citrus Park, is technically within the Glendale city limits, indicating a potential westward extension of Glendale into Citrus Park in the future. Northern Avenue is the northern boundary of Citrus Park.

Demographics

2020 census data

American Community Survey data 
Information from American Community Survey 2016-2020 five-year estimates:

Notes

Census-designated places in Maricopa County, Arizona